Chlorochroa pinicola is a European species of shield bug in the tribe Nezarini.

References 

Hemiptera of Europe
Insects described in 1852
Pentatomini